Mist is a phenomenon caused by small droplets of water suspended in the cold air, usually by condensation. Physically, it is an example of a dispersion. It is most commonly seen where water vapor in warm, moist air meets sudden cooling, such as in exhaled air in the winter, or when throwing water onto the hot stove of a sauna. It can be created artificially with aerosol canisters if the humidity and temperature conditions are right. It can also occur as part of natural weather, when humid air cools rapidly, notably when the air comes into contact with surfaces that are much cooler than the air (e.g. mountains).

The formation of mist, as of other suspensions, is greatly aided by the presence of nucleation sites on which the suspended water phase can congeal. Thus even such unusual sources of nucleation as small particulates from volcanic eruptions, releases of strongly polar gases, and even the magnetospheric ions associated with polar lights can in right conditions trigger condensation and the formation of mist.

Mist is commonly confused with fog, which resembles a stratus cloud lying at ground level. These two phenomena differ, but share some commonalities; similar processes form both fog and mist. Fog is denser, more opaque, and generally lasts a longer time, while mist is thinner and more transparent.

Description

Cloud cover is often referred to as "mist" when encountered on surfaces of mountains, whereas moisture suspended above a body of water, cleared or marsh area is usually called "fog". One main difference between mist and fog is visibility. Otherwise, it is known as mist.

Mist makes a light beam visible from the side via refraction and scattering on the suspended water droplets, and rainbows can be possibly created.

"Scotch mist" is a light steady drizzle that appears like mist.

Mist usually occurs near the shores and is often associated with fog. Mist can be as high as mountain tops when extreme temperatures are low and strong condensation occurs.

Freezing mist is similar to freezing fog, only the density is less and the visibility greater. When fog falls below 0°C, it is known as freezing fog, however it still stays suspended).

Gallery

See also

Aerosol
Aeroponics
Brocken spectre
Drizzle
Fog
Haze
Spray (disambiguation)
Rain

References

Air pollution
Fog
Psychrometrics